The Government of the 19th Dáil or the 13th Government of Ireland (2 July 1969 – 14 March 1973) was the government of Ireland formed after the general election held on 18 June 1969. It was formed by Fianna Fáil, which had been in office since the 1957 election. This was the first election it won with Jack Lynch as its leader.

The 13th Government lasted for  days.

13th Government of Ireland

Nomination of Taoiseach
The 19th Dáil first met on 2 July 1969. In the debate on the nomination of Taoiseach, Fianna Fáil leader and outgoing Taoiseach Jack Lynch, the Fine Gael leader Liam Cosgrave, and the Labour Party leader Brendan Corish were each proposed. The nomination of Lynch was carried with 74 votes in favour to 66 against. Lynch was re-appointed as Taoiseach by President Éamon de Valera.

Members of the Government
After his appointment as Taoiseach by the president, Jack Lynch proposed the members of the government and they were approved by the Dáil. They were appointed by the president on the same day.

Note

Parliamentary Secretaries
On 9 July 1969, the Taoiseach announced the appointment by the Government of the Parliamentary Secretaries on his nomination.

Arms Crisis

Following the dismissal of ministers, a motion of confidence in the government was proposed by Jack Lynch. It was approved on a vote of 72 to 64.

After the trial, Lynch placed a further motion of confidence in the government, in response to an opposition motion. This was approved on a vote of 74 to 67.

Foreign affairs
The government signed the Treaty of Accession to the European Economic Community on 22 January 1972. After a referendum held on 10 May, a constitutional amendment allowing Ireland to become a member of the European Communities was approved with the support of 83.1% of votes cast. Ireland, Denmark and the United Kingdom became members of the EEC on 1 January 1973.

See also
Dáil Éireann
Constitution of Ireland
Politics of the Republic of Ireland

References

External links
Government of Ireland: History of Government: Nineteenth Dáil

Governments of Ireland
1969 establishments in Ireland
1973 disestablishments in Ireland
Cabinets established in 1969
Cabinets disestablished in 1973
19th Dáil